The Ashington Range is a mountain range of the Boundary Ranges in northwestern British Columbia, Canada. North of the Ashington Range lies the Burniston Range.

See also
Coast Mountains

References

Boundary Ranges
Mountain ranges of British Columbia